Kärbu is a village in Audru Parish, Pärnu County, in southwestern Estonia. It has a population of 65 (as of 1 January 2011).

Kärbu is bordered by the Nätsi-Võlla Nature Reserve on its western side.

References

Villages in Pärnu County